Gevrey may refer to:
Gevrey-Chambertin
Maurice Gevrey, mathematician
Gevrey class in mathematics